Deane R. Beman (born April 22, 1938) is an American professional golfer, golf administrator. He was the second commissioner of the PGA Tour, serving from 1974 to 1994.

Early years
Born in Washington, D.C., Beman attended the University of Maryland in nearby College Park, where he was a two-time All-American on the Terrapins golf team.

Following graduation, Beman had a career in the insurance field. During his playing career, he qualified for the U.S. Open at age 17 in 1955. He qualified for the Masters Tournament fourteen times, won the U.S. Amateur twice (1960, 1963), and the British Amateur (1959). He also lost a playoff to Gary Cowan for the 1966 U.S. Amateur.

Pro career
Beman turned professional in 1967 at age 29 and won four times on the PGA Tour between 1969 and 1973. He led for two rounds at the 1969 U.S. Open and finished one shot out of a playoff. Beman was considered short off the tee but complemented it with his short game. Injuries curtailed his playing career. He retired as a player and closed his business practice to become PGA Tour Commissioner.

PGA Tour commissioner
Beman was the second commissioner of the PGA Tour, succeeding Joe Dey in 1974. He introduced The Players Championship concept during this time and developed the Tournament Players Club network of courses around the United States. Beman converted the Tour into a 501-c6 non-profit organization and introduced pension plans for Tour players.

Under his watch, the Tour's board passed a policy requiring all tournaments to support a charitable initiative. Tour charitable contributions grew from less than $1 million a year in 1974 to more than $30 million in 1994.  He formed the Senior PGA Tour, now the PGA Tour Champions, for players 50 and older in 1980 and the Ben Hogan Tour (nowKorn Ferry Tour) as golf's developmental circuit in 1990. In 1983, the Tour expanded the number of exempt players from the top-60 on the season money list to the top-125.

At a meeting on February 28, 1994, The Presidents Cup, an international competition in conjunction with Beman's retirement announcement on the twentieth anniversary of his appointment as Tour commissioner. During his tenure, the PGA Tour's assets grew from $400,000 in 1974 to a reported $260 million in 1994. He was succeeded as commissioner by Tim Finchem, who served for over 22 years.

Later years
After stepping down as tour commissioner in June 1994, Beman resumed his playing career, and competed in 69 senior events through the Constellation Energy Classic in 2005. In 2003, Beman contributed to the design of Cannon Ridge Golf Club with golf architect Bobby Weed, but the golf course was closed for play in 2012 and later again in 2017.

Beman was inducted into the World Golf Hall of Fame in 2000 and was awarded the seventh PGA Tour Lifetime Achievement Award in 2007.

A book chronicling his 20-year tenure as Commissioner was published in 2011, entitled "Deane Beman: Golf's Driving Force," by Adam Schupak.

Amateur wins
1959 British Amateur
1960 U.S. Amateur, Eastern Amateur, Trans-Mississippi Amateur
1961 Eastern Amateur
1963 U.S. Amateur, Eastern Amateur
1964 Eastern Amateur, Porter Cup

Professional wins (6)

PGA Tour wins (4)

PGA Tour playoff record (1–1)

Other wins (2)
1966 Maryland Open (as an amateur)
1971 Quad Cities Open (not an official PGA Tour event)

Major championships

Amateur wins (3)

Results timeline
Amateur

Professional

Note: Beman turned professional between the 1967 Masters and U.S. Open.

LA = Low amateur
"T" indicates a tie for a place
R128, R64, R32, R16, QF, SF = Round in which player lost in match play

Source for The Masters: www.masters.com

Source for U.S. Open and U.S. Amateur: USGA Championship Database

Source for British Open: www.opengolf.com

U.S. national team appearances
Amateur
Walker Cup: 1959 (winners), 1961 (winners), 1963 (winners), 1965 (tied, cup retained)
Eisenhower Trophy: 1960 (winners), 1962 (winners), 1964, 1966
Americas Cup: 1960 (winners), 1961 (winners), 1963 (winners)

See also 

 1967 PGA Tour Qualifying School graduates

References

External links

American male golfers
Maryland Terrapins men's golfers
PGA Tour golfers
PGA Tour Champions golfers
PGA Tour commissioners
Golf course architects
Golf writers and broadcasters
World Golf Hall of Fame inductees
Golfers from Washington, D.C.
People from Bethesda, Maryland
1938 births
Living people